Immamzadeh Mahruq (Persian: امامزاده محروق) is an Immamzadeh/mosque and the resting place of Imamzadeh Muhammad Mahruq ibn Muhammad ibn Zayd ibn Ali and Imamzadeh Ibrahim ibn Ahmad ibn Musa al-Kazim situated in Omar Khayyam and Immamzadeh Mohammad Mahruq Garden in Nishapur, Khorasan Province, in northeastern Iran. According to Iranarchpedia the building and the mosque of the Immamzadeh dates back to the Timurid and the Safavid historical era of Persia. This mosque is now registered as part of the Iranian national heritage list with the registration number of 302. Thourghout history, this mosque has been redecorated and reconstructed several times.

The current mosque was initially built by the order of Amir Kamal-ol Din during the reign of Sultan Husayn Bayqara. Later and during the Qajar era, this mosque was reconstructed by one of the sons of Fath-Ali Shah Qajar, named Farrokhseyr Mirza 'Nayer od-Doleh'.

References 

Nishapur
Khorasan
Mosques in Iran